Kelis is an American music artist and chef. Before her debut, Kelis collaborated with other artists on their albums, including "Fairytalez" with Gravediggaz and "Got Your Money" with Ol' Dirty Bastard. Kelis has released six studio albums, two with Virgin Records: Kaleidoscope (1999), Wanderland (2001), Tasty (2003), Kelis Was Here (2006), Flesh Tone (2010) and Food (2014). After the success of her first album, Kelis commented, "Kaleidoscope was an experiment. I got into the studio, 18 years old. I was angry, I was anxious and waaaaaahhhhh! Whatever came out, came out." A few of her songs have appeared on the Billboard Hot 100 charts, including "Milkshake" which peaked at number three and "Bossy" at number sixteen.

Kelis's only Grammy Award nominations are the two awards for Best Urban/Alternative Performance for the song "Milkshake" in 2004 and Best Contemporary R&B Album for her fourth album "Kelis Was Here" in 2007, but she didn't win either of them. She was nominated for two Billboard Music Awards in 2000, including Best New Artist Video for "Caught Out There". At the New York Music Awards, Kelis won all three nominations that she received, including Best R&B Video and Best Dance Single for "Acapella", and Best R&B Album for "Flesh Tone". Also, she was named the Best Solo Artist at the Glamour Awards in 2004. Overall, Kelis has received 9 awards from 33 nominations.

Antville Music Video Awards
The Antville Music Video Awards are online awards for the best music video and music video directors of the year. They were first awarded in 2005.

|-
| 2011
| "Bounce" (with Calvin Harris)
| Best Editing
|

Billboard Music Awards
The Billboard Music Awards are held to honor artists for commercial performance in the U.S., based on record charts published by Billboard.

|-
| rowspan=2|2004
| Herself
| Top R&B/Hip-Hop Artist - Female
| 
|-
| "Not in Love" (with Enrique Iglesias)
| Top Hot Dance Club Play Single
|

Billboard Music Video Awards
The Billboard Music Video Awards are sponsored by Billboard magazine to honor artists and their music videos. Kelis has been nominated two times.

|-
| rowspan="2"| 2000 
| rowspan="2"| "Caught Out There" 
| Best New Artist Video (Pop) || 
|-
| Best New Artist Video (R&B) ||

Brit Awards
The Brit Awards are the British Phonographic Industry's annual pop music awards. Kelis has won one award from one nomination.

|-
| 2001
| rowspan="2"| Kelis
| International Breakthrough Act || 
|-
| 2005
| International Female Solo Artist ||

DanceStar USA Awards

!Ref.
|-
| rowspan=2|2004
| Herself
| Best Chart Act
| 
|rowspan=2|
|-
| "Milkshake"
| Best Single
|

Glamour Awards
The Glamour Awards are presented annually by the Glamour magazine to women in a variety of fields. Kelis has won one award.

|-
| 2004
| Kelis
| Best Solo Artist
|

Grammy Awards
The Grammy Awards are awarded annually by the National Academy of Recording Arts and Sciences of the United States. Kelis has been nominated for two awards.

|-
| style="text-align:center;"|2004
|"Milkshake"
|Best Urban/Alternative Performance
|
|-
| style="text-align:center;"|2007
|Kelis Was Here
|Best Contemporary R&B Album
|
|-

International Dance Music Awards
The International Dance Music Awards was established in 1985. It is a part of the Winter Music Conference, a weeklong electronic music event held annually. 

|-
|rowspan="2"| 2004
|rowspan="2"| "Milkshake" || Best R&B/Urban Dance Track || 
|-
| Bear Rap/Hip-Hop Dance Track ||

MOBO Awards
The Music of Black Origin Awards (MOBO), first presented in 1996, are held annually in the United Kingdom to recognise artists of any race or nationality who perform black music and "recognise the outstanding achievements of artists who perform music in genres ranging from Gospel, Jazz, RnB, Soul, Reggae to Hip Hop".

|-
| 2004
| "Milkshake"
| Best Video
|

MP3 Music Awards
The MP3 Music Awards (MMA) is an annual music awards show in the United Kingdom, and chosen by worldwide public votes.

|-
| 2010
| "Acapella"
| The HDT Award
|

MTV Europe Music Awards
The MTV Europe Music Awards ("EMAs", originally MTV European Music Awards) were established in 1994 by MTV Networks Europe to celebrate the most popular songs and singers in Europe.

|-
| 2004 ||rowspan="1"| Kelis || Best R&B ||

Music Television Awards

|-
|rowspan="3"| 2004 ||rowspan="2"| Kelis || Best R&B || 
|-
| Best Dance || 
|-
| "Milkshake" || Best Video ||

MVPA Awards

|-
|rowspan="2"| 2007 ||rowspan="2"| "Bossy" || Best Director of a Female Artist || 
|-
| Best Hair ||

New York Music Awards
The New York Music Awards is an annual awards ceremony and live concert.

|-
| rowspan=3| 2011
| rowspan=2| "Acapella"
| Best R&B Video
| 
|-
| Best Dance Single
| 
|-
| Flesh Tone
| Best R&B Album
|

NME Awards
The NME Awards is an annual music awards show in the United Kingdom, founded by the music magazine, NME (New Musical Express). Kelis has won one award from one nomination.

|-
| 2001
| Kelis
| Best R&B/Soul Act
|

Q Awards

|-
| 2000
| "Caught Out There"
|rowspan="2"| Best Video
| 
|-
| 2004
| "Milkshake"
|

Silver Clef Awards

|-
| 2010
| Kelis
| International Award
|

Soul Train Music Awards

!Ref.
|-
| style="text-align:center;"|2007
| "I Love My Chick" (with Busta Rhymes & will.i.am)
| Best R&B/Soul or Rap Music Video
| 
| 
|-
| style="text-align:center;"| 2014
| Kelis
| Centric Award
|

Smash Hits Poll Winners Party
The Smash Hits Poll Winners Party was an awards ceremony which ran from 1988 to 2005. Each award winner was voted by readers of the Smash Hits magazine.

|-
| style="text-align:center;"|2000
| Kelis
| Best New Female Solo Star
|

Teen Choice Awards
The Teen Choice Awards is an awards show presented annually by the Fox Broadcasting Company. Kelis was nominated two times.

|-
| 2004 || "Milkshake" || Choice Single || 
|-
| 2006 || Kelis || Choice Grill ||

TMH Awards

|-
| style="text-align:center;"| 2004
| "Milkshake"
| Favorite Up Tempo Single of the Year
|

UK Music Video Awards

|-
|rowspan="1"| 2011 ||rowspan="1"| "Bounce" (w/Calvin Harris) || Best Dance Video ||

Urban Music Awards

|-
|rowspan="2"| 2007 || "Bossy" || Best Music Video || 
|-
| Kelis || Best R&B Act ||

Vibe Awards

|-
|rowspan="1"| 2004 ||rowspan="1"| "Milkshake" || Club Banger ||

References

External links
 Kelis official website

Kelis
Awards and nominations